Nyanga is the southernmost of Gabon's nine provinces. The provincial capital is Tchibanga, which had a total of 31294 inhabitants in 2013 (more than the half of the province population). Nyanga is the least populated province of the nine and the other least developed, besides Ogooué-Ivindo. It is bordered by Ogooué-Maritime in the northwest, Ngounié in the north, and the Congo to the south (Kouilou Region) and east (Niari Region). The Atlantic Ocean—the lowest point in both Gabon and Nyanga Province—borders it in the west.

Departments

Nyanga is divided into 6 departments:
Basse-Banio Department (Mayumba) 
Douigni Department (Moabi) 
Doutsila Department (Mabanda)
Haute-Banio Department (Ndindi) 
Mongo Department (Moulengui-Binza)
Mougoutsi Department (Tchibanga)

Statistics
Area: 21,285 km²
2-letter abbreviation/HASC: GA-NY
ISO 3166-2: GA-05
Population (2013): 52,854

Historical population figures

The population in 1991 was almost a quarter less than the 1981 population; the population density in the mid to late 1980s dropped below 2/km².

Places

B–C

D–F

G–I

K–L

M–N

O–P

R–S

T–V

Y–Z

References 

 
Provinces of Gabon